The Cena is a small river in Semigallia, Latvia, and a right-hand tributary of the Misa. The river starts in Cenas tīrelis swamp, in Mārupe Municipality and ends at its confluence in the Misa river in Jelgava Municipality. The Cena has been channelized for almost its entire length.

References

External links

Rivers of Latvia
Tributaries of the Iecava (river)
Misa (river in Latvia)
Mārupe Municipality
Olaine Municipality
Jelgava Municipality